Richard English (born 1995) is an Irish hurler who plays as a left corner-back for club side Doon and at inter-county level with the Limerick senior hurling team.

Early life

English was born in Doon, County Limerick. His cousin, Darragh Fitzgibbon, is a member of the Cork senior hurling team.

Playing career

University

During his studies at Mary Immaculate College, English was selected for the college's senior hurling team and was appointed captain of the team in his second season. On 27 February 2016, he won a Fitzgibbon Cup medal as Mary I won their first ever title after a 1-30 to 3-22 defeat of the University of Limerick. English was once again at full-back when Mary I retained the title in 2017 following a 3-24 to 1-19 defeat of Carlow Institute of Technology.

Club

English joined the Doon club at a young age and played in all grades at juvenile and underage levels, enjoying championship success in under-12, under-14 and under-15 grades. As a member of the club's minor team, he won back-to-back championship medals in 2012 and 2013 following respective defeats of Patrickswell and Na Piarsaigh. English made his senior championship debut for the club in 2012.

Inter-county

Minor and under-21

English first played for Limerick at minor level in 2012, in season which ended with a defeat by Clare in the Munster Championship semi-final. He was eligible for the minor grade once again the following year and was also appointed captain of the team. On 23 July 2013, English was at right corner-back when Limerick won their first Munster Championship title in 29 years after a 1-20 to 4-08 defeat of Waterford. 

English joined the Limerick under-21 hurling team in 2014. In his second season he won a Munster Championship medal after a 0-22 to 0-19 win over Clare in the final. On 12 September 2015, English was at full-back when Limerick defeated Wexford in the All-Ireland final. He ended the season by being named the Bord Gáis Energy Player of the Year.

Senior

English joined the Limerick senior hurling team in January 2014. He was released from the panel prior to the start of the Munster Championship.

On 13 February 2016, English made his senior debut at left corner-back in a National League defeat of Wexford. Later that season he made his first championship start in a 3-11 to 1-16 Munster Championship semi-final defeat by Tipperary.

On 19 August 2018, English was at left corner-back when Limerick won their first All-Ireland title in 45 years after a 3-16 to 2-18 defeat of Galway in the final. Later that day he was named on The Sunday Game Team of the Year. English ended the season by winning an All-Star Award.

On 31 March 2019, English was selected at left corner-back for Limerick's National League final meeting with Waterford at Croke Park. He collected a winners' medal following the 1-24 to 0-19 victory. Hours after the league title victory, his father Paddy English died after a long illness. On 30 June 2019, English won a Munster Championship medal at left corner-back following Limerick's 2-26 to 2-14 defeat of Tipperary in the final. He ended the year by being nominated for a second All-Star award.

On 23 February 2020, it was confirmed that English had been ruled out for the rest of the season with a cruciate injury.

Career statistics

Honours

Mary Immaculate College
Fitzgibbon Cup (2): 2016 (c), 2017

Doon
Limerick Minor Hurling Championship (2): 2012, 2013

Limerick
All-Ireland Senior Hurling Championship (2): 2018, 2020
Munster Senior Hurling Championship (3): 2019, 2020, 2021
National Hurling League (2): 2019, 2020
All-Ireland Under-21 Hurling Championship (1): 2015
Munster Under-21 Hurling Championship (1): 2015
Munster Minor Hurling Championship (1): 2013 (c)

Awards
All-Star Award (1): 2018
The Sunday Game Team of the Year (1): 2018

References

1995 births
Living people
Doon hurlers
Limerick inter-county hurlers
Alumni of Mary Immaculate College, Limerick